Leucopogon oppositifolius is a species of flowering plant in the heath family Ericaceae and is endemic to the south of Western Australia. The flowers are arranged in short spikes on the ends of branches with leaf-like bracts and narrow bracteoles about half as long as the sepals. Flowering mainly occurs from July to December.

The species was first formally described in 1845 by Otto Wilhelm Sonder in Lehmann's Plantae Preissianae from specimens collected near King George Sound in 1840. The specific epithet (oppositifolius) means "opposite-leaved".

Leucopogon oppositifolius occurs in the Avon Wheatbelt, Esperance Plains, Jarrah Forest and Mallee bioregions of southern Western Australia and is listed "not threatened" by the Western Australian Government Department of Biodiversity, Conservation and Attractions.

References

oppositifolius
Ericales of Australia
Flora of Western Australia
Plants described in 1845
Taxa named by Otto Wilhelm Sonder